Polylepis microphylla is a species of plant in the family Rosaceae. It grows in the Andes of Ecuador and Peru.

References

microphylla
Vulnerable plants
Trees of Ecuador
Trees of Peru
Taxonomy articles created by Polbot